Scopula falcovitshi is a moth of the family Geometridae.

References

Moths described in 1992
falcovitshi